Rendel, also known as Rendel: Dark Vengeance is a 2017 Finnish superhero film written, produced and directed by Jesse Haaja. The film is based on Haaja's self-created character, Rendel. Lead roles are played by Kris Gummerus, Matti Onnismaa, Rami Rusinen and Renne Korppila. The rest of the cast includes Alina Tomnikov, Tero Salenius, Aake Kalliala, Anu Palevaara and Kristina Karjalainen. The film won the Best Action Movie award at the Feratum Film Festival in Mexico.

The sequel, Rendel 2: Cycle of Revenge, is scheduled for release sometime in early 2021.

Plot
In the city of Mikkeli, Finland, a company called VALA has developed a successful vaccine without proper testing. However, the organization is a front for a criminal organization, led by Pekka Erola, whose son Jarno aka "Rotikka", is one of the biggest thugs in the group. However, a mysterious figure decked out in black has been wreaking havoc against VALA and their men. When the mysterious man brutalizes six men, Rotikka notices each man is hung with the name "Rendel" etched in their bodies. Through flashbacks, we learn about Ramo, a financial director of a company who is a family man with his wife and daughter. They give him a biker jacket for a Father's Day gift. However, when he doesn't accept to invest to a Vala worker named Kurrikka, the latter calls his boss and tells him what happened. Then, Kurrikkas boss calls Ramo's boss and forces him to fire Ramo. Ramo then has trouble finding a job and struggles financially.

Ramo, through the advice of the man who got him fired, Kurrikka, gets a job at VALA filing paperwork but Ramo finds himself looking through it one day. He learns the vaccine, made up of a tar that sticks to skin permanent if bonded, has not been properly tested and has in fact, resulted in numerous deaths. Ramo finds himself at crossroads. However, Erola fears Ramo may be a whistleblower. He sends Rotikka and Lahtaaja to kill Ramo and his family. While Ramo's wife and daughter are killed, Ramo is hit with a baseball bat with barbed wire attached and left to die. However, he survives and keeping a canister of the tar in his cellar, Ramo covers his face with the tar and creates a mask. Using the biker jacket given to him by his family and gloves, Ramo becomes the dark avenger Rendel, named after the Hungarian word for "order". A mysterious woman named Marla arrives to help Rendel when needed.

Erola, learning of Rendel's fight against the organization, finds himself answering to higher ups within the organization. The higher ups decide to hire a band of foreign mercenaries to deal with Rendel. The group consists of Mike, Radek, Stacy, Julia, and Jimmy and at first, they are able to overpower Rendel, despite Julia finding herself dead. The others plot to seek revenge. However, Rendel eventually gets himself back in action and eventually wages an all-out war. Meanwhile, a local reporter, Niina Heikkinen, plans to expose VALA for who they are really are. Rotikka kidnaps Niina when he discovers her taking photos of their real crimes. However, Rendel arrives to save her and eventually finds himself defeating all of the mercenaries in various ways. However, when Rendel fights Lahtaaja, Marla attempts to help but she is stabbed from behind and it is revealed that Marla was part of Rendel's imagination as Rendel was the one who was stabbed. Rendel gets a quick second wind and for an eye for an eye, he fatally wounds Lahtaaja with the baseball bat with barbed wire.

Erola, realizing that Rendel is too much, answers again to the higher ups. Having failed his mission, Erola knows he has to be killed for his actions. Rotikka, who had never earned his father's love or trust, is sent in to shoot his father and kills him. As Rotikka leaves the building after killing his father, Rendel waits in the rain and goes face to face with Rotikka. Rendel closes Rotikka's car trunk on his hands before taking syringes of the vaccine and injecting Rotikka in the neck, killing him. A winded Rendel sees Niina and walks away. As Rendel looks in the heart of Mikkeli, the higher ups vow to get revenge on Rendel.

Cast 

 Kris Gummerus as Rämö / Rendel 
 Matti Onnismaa as Mr. Erola
 Rami Rusinen as Rotikka
 Renne Korppila as Lahtaaja
 Alina Tomnikov as Marla
 Tero Salenius as Kurikka
 Aake Kalliala as Marsalkka
 Reino Nordin as Reikki
 Sami Huhtala as Taneli
 Marko ”Beltzer” Pesonen as Oskari
 Minna Nevanoja as Niina
 Anu Palevaara as Huora
 Michael Hall as Mike
 Johnny Vivash as Radek
 Bianca Bradey as Stacy
 Michael Majalahti as Jimmy
 Sheila Shah as Julia

Production
Produced with a budget of EUR 1.45 million, Rendel was shot for 50 days in autumn 2015 and spring 2016. The film was shot in Kajaani, Mikkeli, Varkaus, Helsinki, Sotkamo, Kuopio and Puolanka, but the actual story itself takes place mainly in Mikkeli. Director Jesse Haaja received nearly 500 sponsors for the film, who were offered visibility in the film, online, and in taping the cars of the film crew. Investments varied between EUR 50 and EUR 70,000, and the financiers include the towns of Mikkeli and Varkaus.

Writing 
Jesse Haaja, Pekka Lehtosaari, Timo Puustinen and Miika J. Norvanto are the writers  of the movie

Music
The song "Wonderman" heard in the film is performed by The Rasmus.

Release

Home media
Rendel was released on DVD and Blu-ray by Shout Factory on January 30, 2018.

Sequel

On May 27, 2018, at the Cannes Film Festival, Jesse Haaja announced that he would be making a sequel to Rendel called Rendel: Cycle of Revenge. While the film did not perform well in its native Finland, it did well internationally and Haaja, along with Black Lion and Canada-based Raven Banner Entertainment, would be working on the sequel.

On August 16, 2019, Haaja announced shooting would begin in September. Due to its international following, it was announced the film would be shot entirely in English and the cast would include original stars Kris Gummerus as Rendel, Tero Selinius as Kurrikka, and Minna Nevanoja as Niina Heikkinen along with Sean Cronin as the film's central villain Smiley; Kaitlin Boye as Fugu, Bruce Payne as Edward Cox, and Jonah Paull. Jessica Wolff is replacing Alina Tomnikov as Marla in the sequel.

References

External links 
 
 
 Laitinen, Janne (December 21, 2014). "Savolaista supersankarileffaa kuvataan Varkaudessa". Savon Sanomat.
 Tynkkynen, Ossi (December 12, 2014). "Rendel-elokuvassa mukana tuttuja näyttelijöitä - katso tiiseri". Länsi-Savo.
 "Virallinen Rendel-traileri on julkaistu: Mikkelin maskimies haastaa Marvelin supersankarit". Dome. May 15, 2017 (Finnish).

2010s superhero films
Films set in Finland
Films shot in Finland
2010s Finnish-language films
Finnish action films
Finnish science fiction films